Anja Schäfer (born 11 July 1966) is a German former rower. She competed in the women's eight event at the 1988 Summer Olympics.

References

External links
 

1966 births
Living people
German female rowers
Olympic rowers of West Germany
Rowers at the 1988 Summer Olympics
People from Hattingen
Sportspeople from Arnsberg (region)